During the Mexican Revolution, from roughly around 1913 to 1917, the peasants from the Mexican region of Morelos established a territory with an alternative political, and economic system. They were heavily influenced by Emiliano Zapata and his ideology of zapatism. The political and economic structure of the territory was militarily supported by the Liberation Army of the South, which was where the army was formed. The commune is also at times compared to the Makhnovshchina in eastern Ukraine, due to their shared structures and ideals.

History

Manuel Palafox's agrarian reform
The temporary peace during 1914 provided time for the farmers of southern Mexico to lay the foundations for the socio-economic reconstruction of the country. The most important political tool in the revolutionary struggle was the Liberation Army of the South, which not only fought but expropriated and distributed the lands as soon as it could. In 1914, Manuel Palafox was appointed Minister of Agriculture by the Aguascalientes Convention, becoming the Zapatista with the highest office in the nascent democratic government of the convention, which brought together almost all the then existing Mexican revolutionary forces on 1 October 1914. From January 1915 Palafox began to draw up plans to implement agrarian reform: firstly he founded the National Bank of Rural Credit and then a whole series of structures (Regional Agriculture Schools and the National Factory of Agricultural Tools) necessary for agrarian development in the egalitarian sense.

The Morelos Commune
Palafox radicalized the Plan of Ayala, expropriating lands from landowners without compensation, issuing a very revolutionary agrarian law which could only be applied in the Zapatista state of Morelos. The main problem was that the convention was not able to influence national politics, due to internal divisions and external threats.

Starting from 1915, in any case, egalitarian policies were implemented, aimed at creating self-managed peasant communities in which the government, governors and governed proceeded together and without seeking power for their own sake. As a result, every form of hierarchical power was substantially overthrown. The police, state officials and the army were stripped of the power exercised in the past, the same Southern Liberation Army when not engaged in battle was, in fact, a structure without power. 
The Zapatistas also gave great importance to education, young students and intellectuals came to Morelos to create public schools and adult education.
At the end of 1917 the Zapatista communities were basically able to manage themselves, thanks to the effective popular assemblies that held the administrative power of the municipalities. Government existed, but it went from bottom to top and not vice versa. Zapata himself set the example by refusing any power, whether local or national:

Downfall 
The Morelos Commune would begin its decline when Venustiano Carranza assumed power in 1917, being recognized as President of Mexico by the imperialist powers of Germany and the United States. Carranza, at this point now fighting his once fellow revolutionaries, ordered general Pablo Gonzalez to pacify Morelos. Using overwhelming firepower, he successfully pushed Zapata's guerrilla forces out of the cities of Morelos. A year later, Zapata was able to push Gonzalez's army out of Morelos. The commune now was only a shell of its former self. As his forces were always under military pressure in Morelos by his opponents, Zapata's civil administration was unable to carry out any major reforms in the region. Unable to hold together their alliance with the Villistas, and increasingly reliant on the liberal Felicistas, Palafox was removed from his post and the Aguascalientes Convention was dissolved.

Being pressured by Gonzalez's forces, Zapata attempted to convince a desertion with one of Gonzalez's cavalry officers. At the meeting where Zapata discussed this, he was assassinated. The Morelos Commune ceased to exist at this point, as the now demoralized guerrillas were pushed back into the mountains. The population of Morelos, especially the peasants would suffer repercussions by the occupying forces, including the burning of villages, and slave labor.

Ideology 
The Morelos Commune shared many similarities in political structure with its contemporary Makhnovshchina in Ukraine, it also inspired the creation of the Zapatista Autonomous Municipalities in 1994, militarily protected by the EZLN, in the state of Chiapas, Mexico.

References 

Anarchist communities
History of Morelos
Mexican Revolution